Nurme is a village in Märjamaa Parish, Rapla County in western Estonia. As of 2021, it has a population of 42.

References

 

Villages in Rapla County